Thorco Projects is a Danish shipping company based in Copenhagen, Denmark.

History
On May 1, 2003, Thorco Projects set sails in the historical maritime town of Svendborg, Denmark. With just four geared multipurpose tween deck vessels. Through organic growth business increased and by the end of 2012 Thorco Projects operated 55 vessels through 10 offices. In July 2013, Thorco merged with Clipper Projects. Today Thorco Projects is one of worlds leading multi purpose/project owner and operator. With around 70 vessels and 15 local offices around the world.

Company

Thorco Projects has 15 offices in 13 countries and operates a fleet of about 70 multipurpose ships of sizes between 7,800 and 20,000 DWT. Thorco Projects A/S is a subsidiary of the Thornico Group of Companies. In addition to shipping, Thornico Group is active in Food, Technology, Sport and Fashion, Real Estate, Tech and Financing industries.

The company was the operator of the ship MV Thorco Cloud, which sank in the Singapore Strait following a collision in December 2015.

References

External links
 Official website

Shipping companies of Denmark
Danish companies established in 2003
Shipping companies based in Copenhagen
Companies based in Copenhagen Municipality